T. Naidu Palem (TNP) in its full form is known as Turpu Naidu Palem, turpu in Telugu meaning East. It is a small village located in Tangutur Mandal, Prakasam district in the state of Andhra Pradesh, India. T Naidu palem is located near the bay of Bengal coast.

Geography
T. Naidu Palem is located at  (15.3892333, 080.0381222).

References

External links
 Draft Electoral Rolls

Villages in Prakasam district